"Sunshine on My Shoulders" (sometimes titled simply "Sunshine") is a song recorded and co-written by American singer-songwriter John Denver. It was originally released as an album track on 1971's Poems, Prayers & Promises and later, as a single in 1973. It went to number one on the Billboard Hot 100 chart in the U.S. in early 1974.

Song history 
Denver described how he wrote "Sunshine on My Shoulders": "I wrote the song in Minnesota at the time I call 'late winter, early spring'. It was a dreary day, gray and slushy. The snow was melting and it was too cold to go outside and have fun, but God, you're ready for spring.  You want to get outdoors again and you're waiting for that sun to shine, and you remember how sometimes just the sun itself can make you feel good. And in that very melancholy frame of mind I wrote 'Sunshine on My Shoulders'."

The song was slightly remixed for single release, with the addition of strings and woodwinds to enhance the background of the song. The album version features an extra verse, not heard on the Singles charts, due to the song's length. In addition to Denver's first verse describing if he had a day and a song, the second verse mentions Denver's describing if he had a tale and a wish. The song ends with the words "Sunshine almost always" (instead of "Sunshine always"), being held on until the song's end. The full length single mix with the second verse has been released on most of Denver's hits compilations.

It was originally the B-side of one of his earlier songs, "I'd Rather Be a Cowboy". As the Vietnam War came to an end, the song took on a new significance and began to receive airplay on adult contemporary radio stations. It entered the Billboard Hot 100 at number 90 on January 26, 1974, and moved into the number one spot nine weeks later, remaining at No. 1 for one week. The song also topped the adult contemporary chart for two weeks in 1974. Billboard ranked it as the No. 18 song for 1974.  Cash Box said "Soft, tender ballad receives a treatment equal to the task and the pretty lyrics come shining through as a result. A good remedy for relaxation in these troubled times." Record World said that "Denver scores with this ballad which will send him back home to the top of the charts."

Personnel
John Denver – 6 & 12-string acoustic guitars, vocals
Mike Taylor – acoustic guitar
Richard Kniss – double bass
Frank Owens – piano

The song also features strings and winds, including oboes.

In popular culture
A -hour made-for-television movie titled Sunshine, which aired on NBC in 1973, used the song as a theme.  The movie starred Cliff DeYoung and Cristina Raines. It told the story of a young mother dying from cancer. High ratings prompted a TV series (also Sunshine) which ran for three months during the summer of 1974.  The short-lived series began where the movie left off with the young widowed father (DeYoung) raising his stepdaughter (Elizabeth Cheshire).  

In the John Denver biographical film Take Me Home: The John Denver Story (2000) it is played when Denver (Chad Lowe) takes his new glider out for a test flight. This final scene is based on the real life event that killed Denver in 1997. The 1996 re-recorded version is the one that is played.

Chart performance

Certifications

Carly Rae Jepsen version

The song was covered by Canadian singer-songwriter Carly Rae Jepsen as the lead single from her debut studio album, Tug of War, released on June 16, 2008.

See also 
List of RPM number-one singles of 1974
List of Hot 100 number-one singles of 1974 (U.S.)
List of number-one adult contemporary singles of 1974 (U.S.)

References

Bibliography
The Billboard Book of Top 40 Hits, Billboard Books, 9th edition, 2010, 

1973 singles
Songs written by John Denver
John Denver songs
Billboard Hot 100 number-one singles
Cashbox number-one singles
RPM Top Singles number-one singles
1971 songs
Song recordings produced by Milt Okun
RCA Records singles